Flying Tart was an independent record label based in Nashville, Tennessee. It was started by Alex Parker, formerly of R.E.X. Records, and operated from 1990 until 1996 when it was purchased by Light Records.

Bands
Aleixa (aka Sorrow of Seven)
Breakfast with Amy
Circle of Dust
Fluffy - Duraluxe
The Huntingtons
Left Out
Plague of Ethyls
Scaterd Few
Six Feet Deep
Sixpence None the Richer
Spy Glass Blue
The Throes
The Julies

References

See also
 List of record labels

Record labels based in Nashville, Tennessee
Record labels established in 1990
Record labels disestablished in 1996
American independent record labels
Alternative rock record labels
1990 establishments in Tennessee
1996 disestablishments in Tennessee